Ko Kan Ko Sata is a musician from southern Mali. She plays the kamale n'goni, a traditional eight-stringed lute, and is said to be the only woman who plays this instrument.

Her self-named album features her singing and playing the kamele n'goni, accompanied by balafon and flute. It has been released on Honest Jon's, a record label run by Damon Albarn.

Her work is also featured on Damon Albarn's 2002 album, Mali Music.

References

 Financial Times magazine, July 23/24 2005, page 39

Living people
Malian musicians
Year of birth missing (living people)
21st-century Malian people